BBC Studios Productions is a British content production company and is BBC Studios production division, producing a wide range of programmes from things like Top Gear to Strictly Come Dancing. BBC Studios Productions is responsible for producing programmes while BBC Studios is in charge of ventures like UKTV and the distribution and selling of formats of BBC programmes. BBC Studios Productions is the biggest content producer in the United Kingdom.

Divisions 
BBC Studios Productions has 11 production divisions responsible for producing different programmes for broadcasters including Apple TV+, Amazon Prime Video, Channel 4, Channel 5, UKTV, Discovery Channel, Netflix and PBS.

BBC Studios Science Unit 
The BBC Studios Science Unit has produced a wide range of scientific programmes for multiple broadcasters. The department is headed up by Andrew Cohen and is overseen by the Factual Managing Director Tom McDonald.

Titles 
 The Edge of Science (YouTube Original)
 The Surgeon's Cut (Netflix)
 The Planets (BBC Two)
 8 Days: To the Moon and Back (BBC Two)
 Horizon (BBC Two)
 The Sky at Night (BBC Four)
 The Truth About... (BBC One)
 Stargazing Live (BBC Two)
 Climate Change – The Facts (BBC One)
 Extinction: The Facts (BBC One)
 Greta Thunberg: A Year to Change the World
 Cook Clever, Waste Less with Prue and Rupy (Channel 4)
 Perpetual Planet: Heros of the Oceans (National Geographic)

BBC Studios Factual Entertainment Productions 
BBC Studios Factual Entertainment Productions is responsible for delivering entertaining and enriching programmes. The Factual Entertainment productions is headed by Naomi Carter and is overseen by managing director of Factual Entertainment and Events Hannah Wyatt.

Titles 
 Top Gear (BBC One)
 Countryfile (BBC One)
 The One Show (BBC One)
 Nigella: At My Table (BBC Two)
 Dragons' Den (BBC Two)
 Gardeners' World (BBC Two)
 Antiques Roadshow (BBC One)
 Amazing Hotels: Life Beyond the Lobby (BBC Two)
 Bargain Hunt (BBC One)
 Jay Blades' Home Fix (BBC One)
 Nigella's Cook, Eat. Repeat (BBC Two)
 Celebrity Painting Challenge (BBC One)
 DIY SOS (BBC One)
 Morning Live (BBC One)
 It's Grime Up North (Channel 4)
 Weatherman Walking (BBC One)
 Wanted Down Under
 Points of Viewdr

BBC Studios Music Productions 
BBC Studios Music Productions is the production arm of BBC Studios Productions responsible for any music related commissions. The BBC Studios Music Productions is headed by James Payne and is overseen by Entertainment and Music Managing Director Suzy Lamb.

Titles 
 Glastonbury (BBC)
 Later... with Jools Holland (BBC Two)
 Mercury Prize (BBC)
 Soul America (BBC Four) 
 Reading + Leeds (BBC)
 Top of the Pops (BBC Two)
 BBC Young Musician (BBC Four)
 K-Pop Idols: Inside the Hit Factory (BBC Four)
 Maestro (BBC Two)
 Fleetwood Mac: Don't Stop (BBC One)
 Proms in the Park (BBC)
 Jools' Annual Hootenanny (BBC Two)

BBC Studios Entertainment Productions 
BBC Studios Entertainment Productions produces enthralling, genre-leading content producing titles such as Children in Need and Strictly Come Dancing. BBC Studios Entertainment Productions is headed by Mel Balac and is overseen by Entertainment and Music Managing Director Suzy Lamb.

Titles 
 Strictly Come Dancing (BBC One)
 Question of Sport (BBC One)
 Elton John: Uncensored (BBC One)
 The Big Night In (BBC One)
 Comic Relief (BBC One)
 Children in Need (BBC One)
 Eurovision Song Contest (BBC One)
 A Royal Team Talk: Tackling Mental Health (BBC One)
 The Weakest Link (BBC One)
 EastEnders: Secrets from the Square (BBC One)
 Got it Covered - BBC Children in Need (BBC One)
 Mastermind Cymru (S4C)

BBC Studios Kids & Families Productions

Titles 
 Blue Peter
Go Jetters
JoJo & Gran Gran

BBC Studios Documentary Unit

Titles 
The Met: Policing London
Life and Death Row
Landward
Rip Off Britain
Imagine

BBC Studios Events Productions

Titles 
Royal Christmas Message

BBC Studios Drama Productions

Titles 
Doctor Who
Father Brown
Shakespeare & Hathaway: Private Investigators
Silent Witness

BBC Studios Natural History Unit
Main article: BBC Studios Natural History Unit

Titles 
Main article: BBC Studios Natural History Unit filmography

BBC Studios Continuing Drama Productions

Titles 
EastEnders
Casualty
Doctors
River City
Pobol y Cwm

BBC Studios Comedy Productions

Titles 
Good Omens
Inside No. 9

References

Studios Productions
Television production companies of the United Kingdom